Ben Loft (born ) is an Australian former volleyball player. He was part of the Australia men's national volleyball team. He competed with the national team at the 2000 Summer Olympics in Sydney, Australia, finishing 8th.

References

External links
 profile at sports-reference.com

1978 births
Living people
Australian men's volleyball players
Place of birth missing (living people)
Volleyball players at the 2000 Summer Olympics
Olympic volleyball players of Australia
Sportspeople from Melbourne